Leonard Independent School District is a public school district based in Leonard, Texas (USA).

In 2009, the school district was rated "recognized" by the Texas Education Agency. The school's mascot is the Tiger and the colors are Blue and Gold. Their mascot's name is Paws.

Schools
Leonard High School
Leonard Junior High School
Leonard Intermediate School
Leonard Elementary School

References

External links
Leonard ISD

School districts in Fannin County, Texas
School districts in Hunt County, Texas
School districts in Collin County, Texas